Benjamin Bosse High School, referred to as Evansville Bosse High School by the IHSAA, is a public high school of the Evansville Vanderburgh School Corporation in Evansville, Indiana, United States. Bosse is the third smallest high school by enrollment of Vanderburgh County's nine high schools. The school is a contributing property to the Lincolnshire Historic District on the National Register of Historic Places.

History

The school was initially financed by Benjamin Bosse, who was the mayor of Evansville from 1914 to 1922. Construction began on the school in 1922 and opened for its first pupils in 1924, serving what was then the east side of Evansville.

Bosse's boys basketball team won the state championship in 1944 the first area team to do so. The school won again in 1945 and 1962. Bosse's band marched in the Orange Bowl in Miami, Florida on New Year's Eve in 1970-1971 and also played in the opening ceremony of the Olympic Games in Munich, Germany.

Sports

Also see: Sports in Evansville

State Titles

 Boys Basketball (1943–44), (1944–45), (1961–62)

Notable alumni
 Marty Amsler, former National Football League defensive end
 Pete Fox, Major League Baseball player from 1933 to 1945.
 Roy Halston Frowick, fashion designer
 Arad McCutchan, Hall of Fame basketball coach, University of Evansville
 Michael Michele, actress, best known for ER
 Talitha Washington, mathematician and STEM education activist at Howard University
 Roger H. Zion, U.S. congressman for Indiana (1967–1975)

See also
 List of high schools in Indiana

References

External links
Evansville Vanderburgh School Corporation
Bosse High School web page
Digitized yearbooks, Evansville Vanderburgh Public Library

High schools in Southwestern Indiana
Schools in Evansville, Indiana
Public high schools in Indiana
Southern Indiana Athletic Conference
1924 establishments in Indiana
Educational institutions established in 1924